There are two rivers named Tapera River Brazil:

 Tapera River (Paraíba)
 Tapera River (Paraná)